Ernst Sigismund Fischer (12 July 1875 – 14 November 1954) was a mathematician born in Vienna, Austria. He worked alongside both Mertens and Minkowski at the Universities of Vienna and Zurich, respectively. He later became professor at the University of Erlangen, where he worked with Emmy Noether.

His main area of research was mathematical analysis, specifically orthonormal sequences of functions, which laid groundwork for the emergence of the concept of a Hilbert space.

The Riesz–Fischer theorem in Lebesgue integration is named in his honour.

He is the grandson of composer Karl Graedener.

References

External links 
 
 

Austrian mathematicians
Austrian expatriates in Switzerland
Austrian expatriates in Germany
Scientists from Vienna
1875 births
1954 deaths
Austro-Hungarian mathematicians